Stout is a dark beer made using roasted malts or roast barley.

Stout may also refer to:

Places

 Stout, Ohio, a village also called Rome
 Stout, Colorado, a former town
 Stout, Iowa, a city
 Stout Army Air Field, an airfield in Indianapolis, Indiana
 Stout Creek in Michigan

Other uses

 Horse-fly, commonly referred to as a "Stout"
 20430 Stout (1999 AC3), a main-belt asteroid
 Stout (surname)
 Stout Air Services, an American airline between 1925 and 1929
 Stout Metal Airplane Division of the Ford Motor Company, a defunct American aircraft manufacturer founded by William Bushnell Stout
 USS Stout (DDG-55), a guided missile destroyer
 Toyota Stout, a light truck

See also
 List of people known as the Stout
 Stout Scarab, a 1930–1940s USA automobile
 Stout Spur, Edith Ronne Land, Antarctica
 University of Wisconsin–Stout

fi:Ale#Stout